Kora Terry is a 1940 German drama film directed by Georg Jacoby and starring Marika Rökk, Will Quadflieg and Josef Sieber.

Cast

References

External links

1940 films
Films of Nazi Germany
1940 drama films
1940s German-language films
Films directed by Georg Jacoby
Films about twin sisters
German black-and-white films
German drama films
1940s German films